WRIS may refer to:

WRIS-FM, a radio station (106.7 FM) licensed to Mount Horeb, Wisconsin
WRTZ, a radio station (1410 AM) licensed to Roanoke, Virginia which used the call letters WRIS from 1953–2013